M/C Partners is a private equity firm focused on growth equity investments in emerging companies in the media and communications industries.  M/C invests in early, mid, and late stage companies as well as turnarounds and buyouts in its sectors of focus.  The firm was formerly known as Media Communications Partners.

The firm, which is based in Boston, Massachusetts, was founded in 1986 as a spinout from venture capital firm, TA Associates.  M/C has offices in San Francisco and London.

The firm has raised approximately $2.0 billion since inception across six funds.

History

M/C Partners, formerly known as Media Communications Partners, was founded in 1986. The company's co-founder, Dave Croll, was previously a managing partner at venture capital firm TA Associates. Co-founder Jim Wade also previously worded in the Media/Communications Group at TA.

In 1986, the Media/Communications group and the funds it managed completed a spinout from TA to form an independent firm.  The firm raised its first fund Media / Communications Partners in 1987 with $283 million of investor commitments.  In 1992, the firm's second fund was raised with $167 million of capital and then four years later Media / Communications Partners III was raised with $265 million of capital. M/C raised its fourth fund with $230 million in 1999 and a year later the firm raised M/C Venture Partners V, its largest fund to that point, with $550 million.

Initially, M/C focused primarily on investments in US telecommunications providers and communications-related IT Services.  In more recent years, the firm has expanded its investment focus to include fixed and mobile wireless broadband operators, wireline operators, managed IT service providers, media content providers and communications and infrastructure software developers.

In 2006, the firm completed fundraising for its current M/C Venture Partners VI with $550 million of investor commitments to focus on later stage growth capital investments.

Investments
The firm invests in emerging communications related information technology companies in the US and internationally.  M/C is currently investing out of its sixth fund, M/C Venture Partners VI, a $550 million venture fund raised in 2006.

Among the firm's most notable investments are such notable companies as: AccentHealth, Airband, Cellular One, Fusepoint Managed Services, HyPerformix, ICG Communications, Legendary Pictures, MetroPCS, Mobi, Nuvox, PlumChoice, Inc., Revol Wireless, Triton PCS, Western Wireless Corporation, and Zayo Bandwidth.

References

Staying with CLECs.  Telephony Online, Oct 9, 2000

External links

M/C Partners (company website)

American companies established in 1986
Financial services companies established in 1986
Companies based in Boston
Companies based in San Francisco
Venture capital firms of the United States
1986 establishments in Massachusetts